Hoheneichen is a station on the Alster Valley line, located in Wellingsbüttel, Hamburg, Germany. It is served by the trains of Hamburg S-Bahn lines S1 and S11. The station was opened in 1918.

History  
The station was opened in 1918, and electrified in 1924.

Station layout
Hoheneichen is an elevated station with an island platform and 2 tracks. There is no service personnel attending the station, but an SOS and information telephone is available. There are some places to lock a bicycle as well as a some parking spots. The station is fully accessible for handicapped persons, as there is a lift. There are no lockerboxes.

Service 
The lines S1 and S11 of Hamburg S-Bahn call at Hoheneichen station.

See also  

 Hamburger Verkehrsverbund (HVV)
 List of Hamburg S-Bahn stations

References

External links 

 Line and route network plans at hvv.de 

Hamburg S-Bahn stations
Buildings and structures in Wandsbek
Railway stations in Germany opened in 1918